Eva Elisabet von Bahr (born 17 December 1968) is a Swedish make-up artist and hair stylist. She is best known for her works in Arn: The Knight Templar (2007), The Girl with the Dragon Tattoo (2011), The 100-Year-Old Man Who Climbed Out the Window and Disappeared (2013), and A Man Called Ove (2015), Dune (2021). She received her first Oscar nomination Academy Award for Best Makeup and Hairstyling at the 88th Academy Awards along with Love Larson.

Awards and nominations
 2014: Guldbagge Award for Best Makeup and Hair for The 100-Year-Old Man Who Climbed Out the Window and Disappeared (nominated)
 2015: Guldbagge Award for Best Makeup and Hair for A Man Called Ove (won)
 2015: Academy Award for Best Makeup and Hairstyling for The 100-Year-Old Man Who Climbed Out the Window and Disappeared (nominated)
 2016: Academy Award for Best Makeup and Hairstyling for A Man Called Ove (nominated)
 2022: Academy Award for Best Makeup and Hairstyling for Dune (nominated)

See also

 List of foreign-language films nominated for Academy Awards

References

External links
 Eva Von Bahr at The Makeup Designers
 Eva Von Bahr at Magnolia Agency

 Eva von Bahr på Svensk Filmdatabas

Living people
1968 births
Swedish make-up artists
Swedish nobility
People from Malmö
Best Makeup and Hair Guldbagge Award winners